The Bangalore Development Authority (BDA) of Bangalore, India, is a governmental organization (referred to within India as a parastatal entity) and the principal planning authority for Bangalore. Its function, under the Karnataka Town and Country Planning Act of 1961, is as a regulatory body required "to prepare in the prescribed manner a Comprehensive Development Plan" for the Bangalore Metropolitan Region. It also oversees planning and development of infrastructure, provision of development-related sites and services, the housing needs of underprivileged citizens in Bangalore and is currently the city's largest land developer. No other authority or person may undertake development within the Bangalore Metropolitan Region without the permission of the BDA.

Background 
BDA was created on 6 January 1976 under the Bangalore Development Authority Act 1976 superseding the earlier civic authority known as the City Improvement Trust Board (CITB), but remaining nearly identical in function. The First erstwhile Chairman of BDA was Shri B.T.Somanna. The BDA is a largely unelected local authority (2 out of 23 members are elected BBMP corporators) with most of its members accountable to, and directly appointed by the state government. This creates issues with local representation, particularly since the passage of the Constitution (74th) Amendment Act, 1992 mandating the devolution of planning powers to local, elected authorities.

Despite being the principle planning authority, up to 90% of new residential layouts on the Bangalore periphery do not have formal approval from the BDA. Over time, these layouts tend to be regularised by successive state governments, however they exhibit all of the issues associated with ad hoc residential development including irregular road layouts, boundary encroachments and lack of provision for essential services and infrastructure.

Corruption has always been an issue within the BDA, with one particularly notorious scandal being the illegal sale of up to 200 sites in 1995 by corrupt BDA officials. In the 1990s the BDA came under sustained criticism including the Public Affairs Center's 1993 report cards on BDA performance; the  CUMB Report of 1997 which examined the role and function of the BDA and concluded that the organization had outlived its mandate, was failing as a development authority and should be disbanded; and a 1999 report by the World Bank which labelled it one of the most corrupt and inefficient institutions in the city. The same report also reported on the findings of a citizen survey which found 65% of Bengalureans dissatisfied with their experience dealing with the BDA, and just 1% satisfied—the lowest of any civic agency in the city. It was also receiving the highest share of bribes (33%) in exchange for expediting service outcomes.

The BDA is credited with responding to these findings with some reforms in operational management and asset monitoring and accounting practices leading to a substantial increase in residential layout development and allocation.

In 2008 the Kasturirangan Report reaffirmed that as both developer and land regulator, the BDA has neglected its regulatory role, but gained some additional credibility through the successful delivery of major infrastructure projects including the Outer Ring Road, and various flyovers and underpasses throughout the city. The report recommended land regulation responsibilities be handed over to other municipal bodies such as the BBMP with the BDA focusing on its function as a development body.

Achievements

 The superstructure of the Hebbal Flyover has won an award in the 9th Outstanding Bridge National Awards competition by the Indian Institute of Bridge, Engineers
 Restoration of Lake Agaram
 Restoration of Benniganahalli Lake
 Restoration of Lalbagh lake
 Outer Ring Road

Criticism
 The encroachment and development upon water bodies and tanks essential for the city's drainage system.
 Failure to provide basic amenities (power, water, sewerage, drainage) to residential layouts whilst embarking on still further projects.
 Failure to provide for the rehabilitation of villagers displaced by new layout projects.
 Failure to deliver on planned projects and promised infrastructure.
 Despite the 73rd and 74th amendments to the Indian Constitution devolving power to Panchayats and local urban bodies, the BDA is not similarly responsive through an electoral process to local constituencies.
 The influence of money and vested interests, the so-called "land mafia", in the violation of regulations and land use controls and the development of prime real estate locations.
 Service outcomes decreasing over time despite significant growth in revenues (accounting for population and inflation).
 HC calls BDA the mother of corruption.
 Looks like it is not only BDA allotted sites that get into legal trouble, even auction sites which fetch the BDA crores of rupees that get entangled, in this case for 14 years.
 A series of denotifications hit the BDA arkavathy layout according to this source. This happened after BDA allotted the land to people who paid full amount for the site purchase from their hard earned savings and received lease cum sale agreements from BDA. So their money was with BDA but site GONE.
 People who dare to build a house in a BDA developed layout, might have to stay with no power, water or drainage, not for years but decades as this one talks about facilities in Arkavathy layout and the facilities it offers.
 Do you think BDA apartments are a safer bet, think again, a land owner allegedly cordoned off 300 BDA flat owners from an approach road
 BDA apartments and its amazing quality - read here 
 Yes, according to BDA, they refund people who withdraw their flat application but how easy is it to really get your money back is anyone's guess
 Hebbal flyover, designed and built by BDA is now bursting at the seams with unmanageable traffic according to this report. Does this showcase BDA's long term planning capabilities?

Layouts developed by BDA
Jayanagar
Koramangala
JP Nagar
Anjanapura
Kumaraswamy Layout
Banashankari
Indiranagar
HAL 2nd and 3rd Stages
Domlur
Kasturi Nagar
Sadashivanagar
RMV Extension
HBR Layout
HRBR Layout
HSR Layout
BTM Layout
RT Nagar
Vishweshwaraiah Layout
Arkavathy Layout
Nagarabhavi
Avalahalli (Girinagar)
Banashankari 5th stage
Banashankari 6th stage
West of Chord Road Layout (Basaveshwaranagar)
Nadaprabhu Kempe Gowda Layout
Aecs layout A,B and C blocks, Kundanahalli gate

Names of some layouts with the original names of villages/ areas (after the hyphen (‘-‘))
East Division

H. A. L. II Stage (Part) – Dokkanahalli (Part)
Koramangala VI Block – Ijipura
Austin Town I, II & III Stages – Austin Town
Domlur Layout – Domlur
Koramangala IV Block – Koramangala
H. S. R. Layout - Agara, Yelikunte, Haralakunte & others
H. S. R. Layout III Sector – Haralakunte & Yelikunte
S. T. Bed – Shinivagilu
Sampigehalli I Stage - Sampige halli
Koramangala - Koramangala, Mastri Palya & Katli Palya
Layout between Appareddy Palya & Dokkanahally H. A. L II Stage – Dokkanahally
Domlur II Stage – Domlur
H. A. L. II Stage – Kodihalli
Layout between Appareddy Palya and Dookanahally – Dookanahalli
Domlur I Stage – Domlur
H. A. L. III Stage Jeevan Bima Nagar Main Road
Akkithimmanahally
Layout for slum dwellers – Akkithimmanahalli
H. A. L. II Stage (part) – Kodihalli
H. A. L. II Stage near Airport Road
H. A. L. II Stage (for slum dwellers) – Dokkanahalli
Binnamangala
Layout plan in Sonnenahalli – Sonnenahalli
Koramangala VIII Block – Koramangala
Sonnenahalli further extn.
H. A. L. III Stage - Konena Agrahara
H. A. L. III Stage – Thippasandra
H. A. L. III Stage (Thippasandra Main Road)
Koramangala – Koramangala
Slum Dwellers IV Block, Koramangala – Koramangala
Lakkasandra – Lakkasandra
Ananda Pura Slum H. A. L. III Stage - Konena Agrahara
H. S. R. Layout (Part) - Roopena Agrahara
Koramangala 4th 'B' Block – Mastripalya
H. A. L. III Stage (J. B. Nagar)
Domlur Housing Scheme Phase II, III & IV

NORTH DIVISION

Jayamahal
R. M. V. II stage – Lottegollahalli, Yeshwanthapura hobli
R. M. V. II stage – Bhoopasandra, Kasaba hobli
R. M. V. II stage – Geddalahalli
Palace Upper Orchard
Further extn. of Matadahalli – Matadahalli
Hebbal-Gangenahalli – Gangenahalli
R. M. V. II stage – Geddalahalli
Matadahalli – Gangenahalli
R. M. V. II stage – Gangenahalli
R. M. V. II stage for H. I. G. scheme – Nagashettihalli
Vasantha Nagar
H. R. B. R. III stage – Nagavara
Palace Lower Orchard – Vyalikaval
R. M. V. II stage – Lottegollahalli
H. B. R. II stage (E. W. S. Layout) – Nagavara
H. R. B. R. – Challakere
Pillanna Garden III stage
Pillanna Garden III stage (additional sites) – Kadugondarahalli
Slum dwellers Layout - G. Baiyyappanahalli
R. M. V. II stage (site for land owners) – Nagashettihalli
K. P. West (B. K. Subbaiah) – Mallenahalli
R. M. V. Dollar Scheme - Poorna Pura Mathikere
R. M. V. II stage (HIG additional sites) - Nagashetti halli
R. M. V. II stage - Nagashetti halli
R. M. V. II stage SFHS-HIG - Chickkamarana halli & Nagashetti halli
H. R. B. R. Block 'A' – Lingarajapura
H. R. B. R. III Block – Lingarajapura
R. M. V. II stage - Nagashetti halli
Jabbar block (hutting area)
East of NGEF (part) – Banaswadi, K R Pura hobli
O. M. B. R. (Part) – Banasawadi
R. M. V. II stage – Geddalahalli
K. P. West – Mallenahalli
Gayathri Devi Park extn. - Behind Sankey Tank
Vyalikaval Layout – Vyalikaval
R. M. V. II stage – Geddalahalli
H. R. B. R. I Block - Banaswadi Tank Bed
R. M. V. II stage I Block – Geddalahalli
R. M. V. II stage II Block – Geddalahalli
R. M. V. Extn.
R. M. V. II stage (Sites for Legislators) – Lottegollahalli
Comprehensive Layout Plan of Matadahalli – Metadahalli
O. M. B. R. Layout – Banaswadi
H. R. B. R. I, II & III Block – Banaswadi
H. B. R. I stage - Between Hennur Road and Nagavara
H. R. B. R. II stage (further extn.) – Banaswadi
East of NGEF – Banaswadi, K. R. Pura Hobli
Additional sites in Lingarajapura – Lingarajapura
R. M. V. II stage – Nagashettihalli
East of NGEF (part) – Benniganahalli
Further extn. of east of NGEF – Banaswadi
Arkavathi Layout

WEST DIVISION

R. P. C. Layout – Sy. Nos. of Kempapura Agrahara
Modified layout for industrial workers, Industrial Suburb, North Zone, Rajaji Nagar
Layout plan of Industrial Suburban North Zone, Bangalore
Nagarabhavi I stage – Malagala
E. W. S. Layout Nandhini scheme, shifting of Chamundi Nagar slum – Laggere
M. R. C. R. Layout industrial sites near Tollgate
J. B. Kawal – J. B. Kawal
Okali Puram Layout II stage
Dhobighat under Ashraya Scheme – Laggere
Industrial Town Rajaji Nagar
Nagarabhavi I stage – Nagarabhavi
Chamundi Nagar Welfare Association
West of Chord Road 4th stage 4th block - Agrahara Dasara halli
Small Scale Industry Rajaji Nagar
Ambedkar Seva Sangha – Laggere
Nagarabhavi I stage – Gangondanahalli
Nandhini Layout – J. B. Kawal
Mariyappanapalya slum - Kethamarana halli
IV 'M' Block Rajaji Nagar
Nagarabhavi II stage X Block, C. A. No. 6
Nandhini Layout – Laggere
Ambedkar Layout – K. P. Agrahara
Rajaji Nagar I to IV Block
Mahalakshmi Layout further extn.
Chandra Layout I Phase I Stage
Slum Dwellers at Kirloskar Foundry; further extn. of Mahalakshmi Layout
Mahalakshmi Layout – Kethamaranahalli
Industrial Sub-urban II Stage – J. B. Kawal
Nagarbhavi I stage (for slum dwellers) – Malagala
Rajaji Nagar V Block
Nagarabhavi I Stage – Nagarbhavi
Chandra Layout I & II Phase – K. P. Agrahara
M. R. C. R. Layout – A. D. Halli
Vijayananda Nagar slum
Krishnananda Nagar slum Industrial suburb II stage
Chandra Layout - Divatige Ramanahalli
Nandini S. F. H. S.
Nagarabhavi II Stage XIV Block – Nagarabhavi
Rajaji Nagar II Stage Milk Colony
Nagarabhavi I Stage – Nagarabhavi
Laggere village E. W. S. – Laggere
Nandini Layout Dollar Layout
Shivanahalli Slum W. C. R. III Stage – Shivanahalli
Dhobi Ghat W. C. R. (ISKCON)
Modified Layout Plan of Sy. no. 1 of J. B. Kawal – J. B. Kawal
Rajaji Nagar IV N Block
W. C. R. 4th stage 4th block - Agrahara Dasara halli
Chandra Layout - Divatige Ramanahalli
Chandra Layout – K. P. Agrahara
Lorry Stand & Godown sites, Industrial Suburb
W. C. R. II stage 
Kengeri Satellite Town
W. C. R. II stage II phase – Kethamaranahalli
Nagarabhavi II stage
W. C. R. III stage
Nagarabhavi II stage
Nandini Layout
M. R. C. R. Layout
Industrial Suburb II stage
Gnana Bharathi Layout Valagerehalli
Gnana Bharathi Layout Nagadevanahalli – Nagarabhavi
Narasimha Layout – J. B. Kawal
Nagarabhavi II stage – Nagarabhavi
Nagarabhavi II stage VII & VIII Block – Malagala
Shop sites at Nandini Layout – J. B. Kawal
Bhovi Colony slum W. C. R. III Stage II Block
Asokarapura Hutting Colony - Yashwanthpura

Comprehensive Development Plans

 1984 1st Development Plan for 1985: Aimed at decongesting the central city area and encourage development around the city periphery.
 1995 2nd Development Plan 
 Revised Master Plan 2007
 Master Plan 2015 approved in 2005.
 Revised Master Plan 2031

See also 

 Bangalore Metropolitan Region Development Authority
 Bangalore Metropolitan Planning Committee
 Bengalore Metropolitan Transport Corporation

References

External links 

 

Government of Bangalore
State urban development authorities of India
State agencies of Karnataka